Bapusaheb Tukaram Pathare (also known as Bapu Pathare and Bapusaheb Pathare) is an Indian politician and a former member of the Maharashtra Legislative Assembly. He served as the first corporator of Kharadi and was a member of the district council of Pune. He was a chairperson of the Pune Municipal Corporation. He was elected to the Maharashtra Legislative Assembly in 2009 from the Vadgaon Sheri Assembly constituency.

Biography
Bapusaheb Pathare grew up in Vadgaon Sheri, Pune. At an early age, he became a local sarpanch and then entered the Pune Municipal Corporation (PMC) and became the chairperson of its standing committee. He was the corporator of PMC by 2009 when he contested the Vadgaon Sheri constituency seat in the Maharashtra Legislative Assembly elections with a ticket from the Nationalist Congress Party. He won against Ajay Bhosale of the Shiv Sena with a margin of 33,116 votes.

Pathare was a member of the district council of Pune and the first corporator of Kharadi. He and his family is said to have a dominance in the political leadership in the suburb of Kharadi, ever since it was a gram panchayat. Kharadi was annexed to the Pune Municipal Corporation in 1997, and the Pathare family led by Bapsaheb actively participated in the city politics afterwards. Indian Express reported in March 2013 that the politics in Vadgaon Sheri is dominated by Pathare and his family, led by him.

In October 2019, Pathare joined the Bhartiya Janata Party.

References

People from Pune
Maharashtra MLAs 2009–2014
Nationalist Congress Party politicians from Maharashtra
Bharatiya Janata Party politicians from Maharashtra
Year of birth missing (living people)
Living people